George Scha(e)f(f)er may refer to:

 George Schaefer (film producer) (1888–1981), American film producer and executive
 George Schaefer (finance), American banking executive
 George Schaefer (director) (1920–1997), American television and theatre director and president of the Directors Guild of America
 George (Schaefer) (born 1950), bishop of the Russian Orthodox Church Outside of Russia
 George Schaeffer, American football player
 George C. Schaeffer (1814–1873), American engineer, chemist, and librarian
 George E. Schafer (1922–2015), United States Air Force surgeon general
 Georg Schäfer (industrialist) (1896–1975), German industrialist and art collector
 Georg Schäfer (artist) (1926–1991), German-American painter
 Georg Anton Schäffer (1779–1836), German physician
 George Schaefer (baseball) (born 1989), American baseball coach and pitcher